Shawnee is a ghost town in Angelina County, in the U.S. state of Texas. It is located within the Lufkin, Texas micropolitan area.

History
Shawnee was one of the first communities in the county during the antebellum Texas era. There was a barrel stave making operation in Shawnee during the start of the 20th century on the Texas and New Orleans Railroad at the community's switch station. The majority of workers here were from the former Yugoslavia and shipped their products to Germany. There was also farming and turpentine manufacturing in the community. It was listed as having one business and 25 inhabitants by the Texas Almanac in the 1930s and 1940s.

Geography

Education
Today, the ghost town is located within the Huntington Independent School District.

See also
List of ghost towns in Texas

References

Geography of Angelina County, Texas
Ghost towns in East Texas